Woseriner See is a lake in the Ludwigslust-Parchim district in Mecklenburg-Vorpommern, Germany. At an elevation of 37.2 m, its surface area is 2.35 km2.

External links 
 

Lakes of Mecklenburg-Western Pomerania